Konstantinovsky District is an administrative and municipal district (raion), one of the twenty in Amur Oblast, Russia. Its administrative center is the rural locality (a selo) of Konstantinovka. Population:  14,847 (2002 Census);  The population of Konstantinovka accounts for 41.0% of the district's total population.

References

Notes

Sources

Districts of Amur Oblast